Elaphropus is a genus of ground beetles in the family Carabidae. There are at least 370 described species in Elaphropus.

See also
 List of Elaphropus species

References

External links

 

 
Trechinae